Kate Burton may refer to:

Kate Burton (actress) (born 1957), American actress of stage and television
Kate Burton (aid worker) (born 1981), British aid worker who was kidnapped in the Gaza Strip in December 2005 and released later that month

See also
 Catherine Burton (disambiguation)
Katherine Burton (1890–1969), US Catholic convert and biographer